Tihomir of Serbia (Tikhomir Zavidović; велики жупан Тихомир, veliki župan Tikhomir, "Great Župan Tikhomir"; before 1113 – 1171) was the Grand Prince ( / veliki župan) of the Grand Principality of Serbia (1166).

Life
He was the first-born child of Zavida. Tihomir was appointed the Grand Prince of Serbia (1166) by Byzantine Emperor Manuel I Comnenus though he ruled jointly with his brothers. The lands were divided: Stracimir ruled West Morava, Miroslav ruled Zahumlje and Travunia Stefan Nemanja was given Toplica, Ibar, Rasina and Reke. Nemanja was also a vassal to Manuel I, through his appanage of Dubočica. 

Tihomir's younger brother Nemanja aided the Imperial army against the Hungarians in Srem in 1164. The tie between Nemanja and Manuel I was most likely seen as a threat to Tihomir.

Stefan Nemanja built the Monastery of Saint Nicholas in Kuršumlija and the Monastery of the Holy Mother of Christ near Kosanica-Toplica, without the approval of Tihomir. Nemanja had felt that he had the free will of doing so, Tihomir disagreed, Nemanja was, or Tihomir thought that he was trying to assert independence through his relation to Manuel I. Tihomir had Nemanja chained and thrown into jail, his lands were annexed. Nemanja's supporters convinced the Church that Tihomir had done all this because of his disapproval of church building, thus the Church turned against Tihomir, and Nemanja managed to escape the jail and returned to his province.

Stefan Nemanja mobilized an army, possibly with Byzantine help, and headed for the crownland. Manuel I might have been displeased with Tihomir's actions. Nemanja was triumphant; Tihomir and Miroslav and Stracimir were expelled to Byzantium in 1167. Stefan Nemanja quickly became a powerful figure, and Manuel I subsequently turned to Tihomir and his brothers. The Byzantine Empire wanted to see Serbia divided by several princes to keep it weak.

Manuel I provided Tihomir with an army, coming in from Skopje. In 1171, Nemanja raised a large army and defeated Tihomir's forces at the Battle of Pantina near Zvečan. Tihomir drowned in the River of Sitnica. Nemanja captured his other brothers and made peace, giving them rule in their former lands by recognizing him as the only ruler of Serbia. The Nemanjić dynasty was named after Stefan Nemanja who ruled Serbia until 1371.

References

Sources

 
 
 
 

12th-century Serbian monarchs
Vukanović dynasty
Executed monarchs
Eastern Orthodox monarchs
1160s deaths
Year of birth unknown
Executed Serbian people
12th-century Byzantine people
People of the Grand Principality of Serbia
12th-century Eastern Orthodox Christians